Téada, an Irish band, plays traditional music. Téada is Irish for "strings". The five members of the band are fiddle player Oisín Mac Diarmada, button accordion player Paul Finn, Damien Stenson performs on flute, Seán Mc Elwain switches between the bouzouki and guitar and bodhrán player Tristan Rosenstock.

In 2001, through an appearance on the Irish television series, Flosc, Téada first came to national attention. When their eponymous debut album Téada was released, The Irish Times lauded the band for "keeping the traditional flag flying at full mast," and Scotland's Edinburgh Evening News wrote, "If there is a better new band on the Emerald Isle, they must be very, very good."

Current members

Oisín Mac Diarmada 
Oisín is a Clare born but Sligo raised graduate of Trinity College, Dublin in Music Education 1999 All Ireland Fiddle Champion. He plays the fiddle and with Téada and also works as a fiddle tutor. His other skills include lecturing and production work. Mac Diarmada has released some solo work, most notably Ar an bhFidil.

Paul Finn
Paul is a Laois native and plays the button accordion with Téada. He is known to have a pulsating and rhythmic yet traditional performance style on the accordion.

Damien Stenson
Hailing from the rich musical environment of County Sligo, Damien Stenson who is noted for his extensive repertoire and flowing style of playing. Stenson has featured on a number of recent albums including the compilation "Wooden Flute Obsession Vol. 2".

Seán McElwain 
From Ballinode, Co. Monaghan but now resident in Co. Dublin, Seán McElwain plays banjo, guitar and bouzouki with the group. He has recently completed doctoral studies at DKIT examining the musical heritage of the Sliabh Beagh area of Monaghan / Fermanagh. This research has resulting in an acclaimed album entitled 'Our Dear Dark Mountain with the Sky Over it', which has reunited regional repertoire recovered during his doctoral research with some of the region's current musicians. Described by The Irish Times' reviewer Siobhán Long as " a feast for local and curious eared visitor alike", the album has earned plaudits for shedding new light on the musical traditions of the region. In addition to his work with the group, he is also centrally involved in the traditional music festival – 'Scoil Cheoil na Botha' – which he founded in 2007.

Tristan Rosenstock
Tristan plays the bodhrán with Téada on all of the albums to date. He is from Glenageary, on the southside of Co. Dublin in Ireland. Rosenstock has just completed his studies in Irish and Old Irish at Trinity College, Dublin, and presently performs and tours with Téada on a full-time basis. Tristan's interest in traditional Irish music has developed through his years at school in Irish medium education in Scoil Lorcáin and Coláiste Eoin. Rosenstock is the son of Irish language poet Gabriel Rosenstock

Discography

Ainneoin Na Stoirme
Ainneoin Na Stoirme (In Spite of the Storm), released in 2013. The members: Oisín Mac Diarmada, Paul Finn, Damien Stenson, Seán Mc Elwain, Tristan Rosenstock, and Séamus Begley.

1. Dinny O'Brien's/The Sweetheart Reel/Paddy Kenny's (reels)

2. An Spailpín Fánach (song)

3. Deálaí's, No. 1 & 2/The Peeler and the Goat (slides)

4. The Reel With the Birl/Carraigín Ruadh/Ryan's Rant (reels)

5. Pé in Éirinn Í (song)

6. The Jig of the Dead/I Have a House of My Own With a Chimney Built On the Top of It/Paddy Breen's/The Bird's Call (jigs/slip Jig)

7. Saddle Tramp (song)

8. Gone for His Tea/Joe Derrane's/All About Weaving (slow reel/barndances)

9. Brísdín Bréide/The Thatched Cabin/Morning Sunday (jigs)

10. Ar a Mbóithrín Buí/Tell Me Now (song/waltz)

11. James Murray's/Porthole of the Kelp/The Watchmaker/The Spinning Wheel (reels)

Ceol is Cuimhne
Ceol is Cuimhne(Music And Memory), Téada's fourth studio album, released in 2010.The member is as same as previous album "Inné Amárach."

1. Miss Cassidy's/All Around The Room/The Ballintra Lass (reels)

2. The Bog of Allen/Eanach Dhúin/Bill the Weaver's (jigs)

3. Poitín March/Devlin's/Basket of Oysters/Crotty's Glory (march/polka/fling/reel)

4. The Russians are Coming/The Miller's Daughter/The Boston-Sligo Reel (reels)

5. Murty Rabbett's/Gan Ainm from Grier Manuscript/The Crossroads Dance (polka/slip jig/jig)

6. Danny O'Mahony's/The Stormy Night/Paddy Cronin's (jigs)

7. A Sligo Air/ Sally Gally (air/jig)

8. Ríl Liadroma/The Green Cockade/The Mourne Mountains (reels)

9. Granuaile Barndance/The Circus Polka (barndance/polka)

10. Clothiers (air)

11. Paddy Fahy's/Séamus Mór McKenna's (reels)

Inné Amárach

Téada's album Inné Amárach(Yesterday Tomorrow) from 2006 features the five musicians: Oisín Mac Diarmada, Paul Finn, Damien Stenson, Seán Mc Elwain and Tristan Rosenstock.

1. Lady Montgomery's, Follow Me Down To Carlow, Give The Girl Her Fourpence, Jenny Tie Your Bonnet (reels)

2. The Tenpenny Piece, James Kelly's, Comb Your Hair And Curl It (jigs)

3. Jamesy Gannon's, McDermott's, Over The Moor To Peggy (march, barndance, reel)

4. Tá Dhá Ghabhairín Bhuí Agam, The Shelf (polkas)

5. Nóra Críona (air)

6. Delia Keane's, The Horse's Leotard, Seán Buí, The Dawn Chorus (jigs)

7. The Ebb Tide, Peter Wyer's (hornpipes)

8. Sarah's Delight, Paddy Seán Nancy's, The Ireland We Knew, The Ewe Reel (reels)

9. Planxty Crilly, Micho Russell's, Mickey Callaghan's (planxty, polka, slide)

10. Port Aitheantais na gCaipíní, Johnny's So Long At The Fair (jigs)

11. Bonnie Ann, John Kelly's, The Boy In The Boat (reels)

Lá an Dreoilín
Give Us a Penny and Let Us Be Gone. This is the second album released by Téada in 2004 which features five members Oisín Mac Diarmada (fiddle, vocals), John Blake (guitar, flute) Seán McElwain (banjo, bouzouki), Tristan Rosenstock (bodhrán) and Paul Finn (accordion).

1. Brid Thomais Mhurchadha

2. The Stepping Stone/An Tseanbhean Bhocht

3. The League Reel/Peter Horan's/The Flannel Jacket

4. The Ace And Deuce of Piping

5. Humours of Lissadell/Maude Miller/The Jolly Tinker

6. Thios I Dteach An Toraimh

7. Highland Chluain Ard/Clarke's/The Foxhunter's Jig/The Old Maid

8. John Egan's/Saunder's Fort

9. Tom Cawley's/Ta An Coilleach Ag Fogairt An Lae/Rowsome's/Clancy's

10. The Trip We Took Over The Mountain

11. King of the Pipes/Queen of the Fair/The Woodcock

12. Píopa Ainde Mhoir

13. The North Wind/Up Roscommon/Sporting Nell

14. The Green Blanket/Up Sligo/Up Leitrim

Téada

Téada's eponymous debut album was released in 2003 back when Téada had four group members. This album featured John Blake on the flute, guitar, piano and whistle, Oisín Mac Diarmada on the fiddle, piano, whistle and vocals, Seán McElwain on the banjo, bouzouki and backing vocals and Tristan Rosenstock on the bodhrán and backing vocals.

1. Tom O'Connor's/The Joy of My Life/Handy with the Stick (hornpipes & jigs)

2. Teresa Halpin's/Rathlin Island/Michael Hynes' (reels)

3. The Surround/Up in the Garret/Port na Deorai (slip jigs)

4. Peigin's Peadar (song)

5. Micho Russell's/Bill Harte's/The Green Gates (reels)

6. The Chaffpool Post/The Mayday Hornpipe (barndance & hornpipe)

7. The Liffey Banks/Pat Molloy's (reels)

8. A bhean A' Tí Song

9. Tom Roddy's/The Old Firm Jig/The Maid at the Well (jigs)

10. Rossinver Braes (hornpipe)

11. The Crock of Gold/Johnny's Gone to France/The Tailor's Thimble (reels)

References

External links
 Official Téada Website
 Information
 Audio & Video

Celtic music groups
Irish folk musical groups
World music groups
Musical groups established in 2001
Green Linnet Records artists